Rufus Jones (born 10 January 1976) is a Grenadian sprinter. He competed in the men's 4 × 400 metres relay at the 1996 Summer Olympics.

References

1976 births
Living people
Athletes (track and field) at the 1996 Summer Olympics
Grenadian male sprinters
Olympic athletes of Grenada
Place of birth missing (living people)